Chal Ashkuh (also Romanized as Chāl Ashkūh, Chālāshkūh, Chāl Ashkū, Chāl Eshkūh, and ) is a village in Zaz-e Sharqi Rural District, Zaz va Mahru District, Aligudarz County, Lorestan Province, Iran. At the 2006 census, its population was 157, in 33 families.

References 

Towns and villages in Aligudarz County